Madison "Mat" Davis (September 27, 1833 – August 20, 1902) was a slave who became a member of the Georgia Assembly representing Clarke County, Georgia and the first African American postmaster in Athens, Georgia, after being emancipated. He was active in Republican Party politics.

Early years: enslaved carriage-maker to emancipated delegate
Davis was born into slavery and was owned by a carriage maker. After the U.S. Civil War he was freed from slavery at age 31. He was a delegate to Georgia's constitutional drafting convention in 1868.

Representative of Georgia
In 1868, Davis and Alfred Richardson, also a former slave, were elected to the Georgia House of Representatives from Clarke County. Later the same year, 25 of 29 African Americans were ejected from office after Georgia's legislature determined that African Americans had no protected right to serve in public office. Four more were investigated by a committee to determine their heritage and determine whether they were more than one-eighth African-American.

Madison Davis had a light complexion and was one of two African-American representatives allowed to continue in office. Georgia Supreme Court reversed the decision barring African Americans from office the following year in 1869 and all the legislators were returned to office. He was reelected in 1870.

Later career
Davis went into the real estate business. He was appointed postmaster of Athens in 1890 by President Benjamin Harrison; making Davis the first African American to serve in that role. He faced strong opposition from local whites in Athens. (Monroe Morton was the second African-American postmaster in Athens.)

Davis also worked as U.S. Customs Surveyor in Atlanta and was Captain of Relief No. 2, Clarke County's first black fire company.

He is buried at Gospel Pilgrim Cemetery in Athens.

References

Further reading

External links

1833 births
1902 deaths
African-American state legislators in Georgia (U.S. state)
Georgia (U.S. state) postmasters
Politicians from Athens, Georgia
19th-century American slaves
American firefighters
Republican Party members of the Georgia House of Representatives
African-American politicians during the Reconstruction Era
Original 33
American real estate brokers
19th-century American businesspeople
20th-century African-American people